The Cashel Lookout Formation is a formation cropping out in Newfoundland.

Neoproterozoic Newfoundland and Labrador